Cumhur is a Turkish given name usually for males but also for females. People named Cumhur include:

 Abdullah Gül (born 1950), President of the Republic of Turkey, has been known as Cumhur
 Cumhur Oranci (born 1960), Turkish writer 
 Cumhur Yılmaztürk (born 1990), Turkish footballer
  Dr (Mrs) Cumhur Ersoy (born 1944), Consultant eye surgeon

Turkish  given names